Cowboy Up (also known as Ring of Fire) is a 2001 American Western film directed by Xavier Koller. It stars Kiefer Sutherland, Marcus Thomas, Molly Ringwald, and Daryl Hannah. It won the Crystal Heart Award at the 2001 Heartland Film Festival.

Plot
Rising rodeo star Ely Braxton (Marcus Thomas) is recovering from injuries that almost took his life. Against the wishes of his mother Rose Braxton (Melinda Dillon) and girlfriend Connie (Molly Ringwald), Ely starts riding bulls again to achieve his dream of becoming a champion bull rider like his estranged father, Reid Braxton (Pete Postlethwaite). Ely's older brother, Hank (Kiefer Sutherland), is a champion bullfighter and stock contractor, and the two use each other to better their rodeo skills and work together at their family ranch in Santa Maria, California. As Ely's rodeo career becomes highly successful, he starts a relationship with Celia Jones (Daryl Hannah), who is a barrel racer and Hank's love interest. Hank is consumed with anger and jealousy at Ely's betrayal and the brothers become estranged.

At the championship rodeo in Las Vegas, Ely, having ended his relationship with Celia, draws Hank's unridden and greatly feared bull Zapata and asks for Hank's help. Hank tells Ely to let go of the past memories  he has been carrying around his entire life, and gives Ely the address of their father's house in Las Vegas. Ely meets his father, but his father does not recognize Ely and thinks he is a rodeo reporter, but Ely says he is just a bull rider. Ely realizes his father is not the hero he has idolized.

Ely successfully rides Zapata, but is injured; in the process, Hank rushes to save Ely from Zapata, but is killed when Zapata crushes his chest. When the Braxton ranch hand and family friend Joe (Russell Means) brings Zapata back to the Braxton ranch, Rose grabs a shotgun and almost shoots Zapata in her grief over Hank's death, but Joe and Ely talk her down. They say they will shoot Zapata, but Ely remembers Hank's pride in the bull and shoots into the air as Zapata calmly walks into the pasture. Joe tells Ely that Hank would not have shot Zapata.

Cast
Kiefer Sutherland as Hank Braxton
Marcus Thomas as Ely Braxton
Daryl Hannah as Celia Jones
Melinda Dillon as Rose Braxton
Molly Ringwald as Connie
Russell Means as Joe
Anthony Lucero as Jed
Bo Hopkins as Ray Drupp
Pete Postlethwaite as Reid Braxton, Hank's estranged father
Donnie Gay as himself
Pam Minick as herself

Production
The film was shot in Las Vegas, Nevada. Kiefer Sutherland and Daryl Hannah previously co-starred in The Last Days of Frankie the Fly (1997).

Parts of the film were also shot at the Santa Maria Fairpark, home of the Santa Barbara County Fair, and in surrounding communities.

References

External links

2001 films
American Western (genre) films
2001 Western (genre) films
Films shot in the Las Vegas Valley
Films shot in California
Neo-Western films
Rodeo in film
Films scored by Daniel Licht
2001 drama films
Films directed by Xavier Koller
2000s English-language films
2000s American films